Leskovica is a village in the municipality of Aleksandrovac, Serbia. At the time of the 2002 census, the village had a population of  315 people.

References

Populated places in Rasina District